Édison Vicente Méndez Méndez (born March 16, 1979, in Ibarra) is an Ecuadorian football coach and former player who played as either a winger or an attacking midfielder. He is the current manager of LDU Quito's youth categories.

Méndez is a former Ecuador International and is the second-most capped player for his country.

Playing style
He is known for his pace, accurate passing and long range shooting. He is also known as a dead-ball specialist, and generally takes free kicks and corners for his country and club. While he is right-footed, he can play on either wing as well as in the middle.

Club career

Deportivo Quito
Méndez began his career with Sociedad Deportivo Quito of his native Ecuador. After his 2002 FIFA World Cup performances, during which he scored the winning goal in Ecuador's 1-0 win over Croatia, he was rumored to have attracted interest from English clubs, notably Aston Villa and Everton.

Short spells in Ecuador and Mexico
He transferred to Club Irapuato of the Primera División de México for the latter part of the 2004 season, starting 16 games and scoring 5 goals during the remainder of that season. Following Irapuato's relegation the following year, Méndez moved to Santos Laguna, where he struggled to find a place, in 14 games, and scoring 2 goals.

He returned to Ecuador, and was part of the LDU Quito team who won the Ecuadorian Apertura season in 2005.

PSV Eindhoven
In 2006, shortly after the World Cup, there was speculation of a move to Germany, more specifically Hannover. He ended all rumours in August 2006 by signing a one-season loan deal with PSV Eindhoven, which was followed by a contract for three and a half years which would tie him to the Philips Stadion outfit until 2010. He made his debut in the Eredivisie against Willem II, and marked his stamp in his new club by scoring two goals for a 3–1 win. The following week he became the first Ecuadorian to play in the UEFA Champions League and made his debut against Liverpool F.C. He was voted Man of the Match in the game.

In March 2007, he became the first Ecuadorian to score in the UEFA Champions League by getting the only goal in the round of 16 match against Arsenal. Mendez, along with fellow midfielders Timmy Simons and veteran Philip Cocu helped PSV reach the quarterfinals.

Mendez's reputation was enhanced when he was among 50 players nominated for the Ballon d'Or-award for the best players in Europe. In Winter 2007, rumors stated that Mendez wanted a move back to Ecuador.

Return to Ecuador
On August 4, 2009, Mendez returned to Ecuador for personal reasons to play for his former team LDU Quito. However, there is speculation that he could return to the club for the 2012 season.

Going to Brazil
In March, Brazilian club Clube Atlético Mineiro announced Méndez as its new player. The Ecuadorian midfielder started defending his new team after the 2010 FIFA World Cup.

Independiente Santa Fe
On December 11, 2013, it was confirmed that Mendez would join Colombian side Santa Fe.

Return to El Nacional

On January 7, 2015, it was confirmed that would Méndez return to Ecuador to play for El Nacional.

International career

Ecuador U20
He participated at the South American U-20 Championship in Paraguay in 1999, and Olympic qualifying tournament in Brazil in January 2000. Two months later, he was called up to the full squad and made his debut in a 3–1 defeat against Honduras in Quito.

Ecuador national team
He played all three games of Ecuador's 2002 World Cup campaign, scoring in the 1-0 victory in the final group stage match over Croatia, the country's first ever victory in a FIFA World Cup. The win against Croatia came as a surprise, eliminating them and sealing Méndez's reputation as a star. He was seen by many to be the promise or Ecuadorian football and gained interest from many clubs.

He scored five goals in the qualifying stage for the FIFA World Cup, including a dazzling double from long range against Paraguay in 2005, helping Ecuador to a 5–2 win in Quito. With his goals, he helped Ecuador qualify to the Germany 06 edition.

Méndez again played throughout his team's historic campaign in the 2006 FIFA World Cup, which culminated in a 1–0 defeat to England in the round of sixteen. He was credited with two assists throughout the whole tournament.

He played for Ecuador in the Copa América 2007. In that tournament he scored a consolation goal against Mexico as they were eliminated 2-1. On February 26, 2008, Mendez announced his retirement from the national team, to the surprise of most Ecuadorians and the Latin American world. He has stated that one of the reasons for his early retirement is dissatisfaction with the newly appointed Ecuador coach, Sixto Vizuete. However, on 12 May 2008, Méndez announced his return to the national team, after a meeting with Vizuete and the FEF president, Luis Chiriboga, in which they solved any differences and misunderstandings that could have led the player to his early retirement.

On June 30, 2014, after the 2014 FIFA World Cup held in Brazil, Méndez stated that "His cycle is over", retiring from the Ecuador national team after a span of 14 years, ending with 111 Caps and 18 Goals for his country.

Personal life
His nephew is fellow professional footballer and Ecuadorean international player Sebas Méndez.

Career statistics

International goals
Scores and results list Ecuador's goal tally first.

Honors
LDU Quito
Serie A (2): 2005 Apertura, 2010
Copa Sudamericana (1): 2009

PSV Eindhoven
Eredivisie (2): 2006–07, 2007–08

See also
 List of men's footballers with 100 or more international caps

References

External links

Interview in Copa America Official Program
Méndez's FEF player card 
www.psvweb.nl profile

1979 births
Living people
People from Ibarra, Ecuador
Ecuadorian footballers
S.D. Quito footballers
C.D. El Nacional footballers
Irapuato F.C. footballers
Santos Laguna footballers
L.D.U. Quito footballers
PSV Eindhoven players
Clube Atlético Mineiro players
C.S. Emelec footballers
Independiente Santa Fe footballers
Ecuadorian Serie A players
Liga MX players
Eredivisie players
Categoría Primera A players
Campeonato Brasileiro Série A players
Ecuador international footballers
2001 Copa América players
2002 FIFA World Cup players
2002 CONCACAF Gold Cup players
2004 Copa América players
2006 FIFA World Cup players
2007 Copa América players
2011 Copa América players
2014 FIFA World Cup players
Ecuadorian expatriate footballers
Expatriate footballers in Mexico
Expatriate footballers in Brazil
Expatriate footballers in the Netherlands
Expatriate footballers in Colombia
Ecuadorian expatriate sportspeople in Brazil
Ecuadorian expatriate sportspeople in the Netherlands
FIFA Century Club
Association football midfielders
Ecuadorian football managers
C.D. El Nacional managers
L.D.U. Quito managers